The 2007 South American Rugby Championship was the 29th edition of the now multi-divisional rugby competition involving the top rugby nations from South America.

Division A consisted of three teams and was played on a home and away basis.  Two points are awarded for a win and one for a draw.

The competition wasn't completed, because of the difficulties of finding a date for the match between Argentina and Uruguay, as it was the first time they participated in the final phase of the Rugby World Cup.

Standings

Results

External links
History

 IRB – South American Championship 2006

2007
2007 rugby union tournaments for national teams
A
2007 in Argentine rugby union
rugby union
rugby union
International rugby union competitions hosted by Argentina
International rugby union competitions hosted by Uruguay